The Samsung NX 12-24mm F4-5.6 ED is a wide angle zoom lens for Samsung NX mount, announced by Samsung on September 17, 2012.

References
http://www.dpreview.com/products/samsung/lenses/samsung_12-24_4-5p6/specifications

12-24
Camera lenses introduced in 2012